Acanthopleuroceras is an extinct genus of cephalopod belonging to the Ammonite subclass.

References

Early Jurassic ammonites
Jurassic ammonites of North America
Pliensbachian life
Eoderoceratoidea
Ammonitida genera